David Pierre Eto'o Fils (born 13 June 1987) is a Cameroonian professional footballer who plays for Eding Sport, as a right winger.

Early and personal life
Born in Yaoundé, he is the younger brother of Samuel Eto'o, while a younger brother Etienne also played for Real Mallorca. His father was also called David.

Club career
Eto'o began his career with the Kadji Sports Academy in Cameroon, before moving to Spain at the age of 16 with RCD Mallorca. At Mallorca he spent loan spells with Ciudad de Murcia and Yverdon-Sport FC, leaving the club in 2005. Short spells at Sedan, FC Champagne Sports, FC Meyrin, SD Ponferradina and US Créteil-Lusitanos followed, before Eto'o signed with Ukrainian side FC Metalurh Donetsk in April 2007. He later signed with Greek side Aris, where he went on to have a loan spell at Ilisiakos, after his loan spell ended he left Aris and moved back to Spain in August 2008 and signed a contract with CF Reus Deportiu. After two years with CF Reus Deportiu, he later played for Kadji Sports Academy, FC Koper and Union Douala, before signing for Eding Sport in 2018.

International career
Eto'o was called up to the Cameroon national football team, and made his professional debut in a 2–0 2018 African Nations Championship qualification win over Sao Tome and Principe on 12 August 2017. He earned 3 caps for the national team.

References

1987 births
Living people
Footballers from Yaoundé
Cameroonian footballers
Cameroon international footballers
Kadji Sports Academy players
RCD Mallorca players
Ciudad de Murcia footballers
Yverdon-Sport FC players
CS Sedan Ardennes players
FC Meyrin players
SD Ponferradina players
US Créteil-Lusitanos players
FC Metalurh Donetsk players
Aris Thessaloniki F.C. players
Ilisiakos F.C. players
CF Reus Deportiu players
FC Koper players
Union Douala players
Eding Sport FC players
Segunda División players
Football League (Greece) players
Association football wingers
Cameroonian expatriate footballers
Cameroonian expatriate sportspeople in Spain
Cameroonian expatriate sportspeople in France
Cameroonian expatriate sportspeople in Switzerland
Cameroonian expatriate sportspeople in Ukraine
Cameroonian expatriate sportspeople in Greece
Cameroonian expatriate sportspeople in Slovenia
Expatriate footballers in Spain
Expatriate footballers in France
Expatriate footballers in Switzerland
Expatriate footballers in Ukraine
Expatriate footballers in Greece
Expatriate footballers in Slovenia
Cameroon A' international footballers
2018 African Nations Championship players